Soloe splendida is a moth in the family Erebidae first described by Hervé de Toulgoët in 1980. It is found in Rwanda.

References

External links 
 Zwier, Jaap. "Soloe splendida Toulgoët 1980". Aganainae. Retrieved January 2, 2017. Includes original description.

Aganainae
Moths of Africa
Moths described in 1980